Frayer-Miller was built by the Oscar Lear Automobile Company in Columbus, Ohio and advertised as "the car of endurance." It had a distinctive air-cooled engine. The car was manufactured between the years of 1904 and 1910.

Advertisements

References

Defunct motor vehicle manufacturers of the United States
Vehicle manufacturing companies established in 1904
Vehicle manufacturing companies disestablished in 1910
Defunct manufacturing companies based in Ohio
1910 disestablishments in Ohio
1904 establishments in Ohio
Motor vehicle manufacturers based in Ohio
Cars introduced in 1904